Baruch Kopel Goldstein (born Benjamin Carl Goldstein; December 9, 1956 – February 25, 1994) was an Israeli-American mass murderer, religious extremist, and physician who perpetrated the 1994 terrorist attack on a mosque attended by Palestinians, known as the Cave of the Patriarchs massacre in Hebron. Goldstein was a supporter of the Kach, a religious Zionist party that the European Union and other countries designate as terrorist.

On 25 February 1994, Goldstein, a resident of the illegal Israeli settlement of Kiryat Arba near Hebron, entered a room in the Cave of the Patriarchs that was serving as a mosque. Dressed in Israeli military uniform, he opened fire on the 800 Palestinian Muslim worshippers praying during the month of Ramadan, killing 29 and wounding 125 worshippers, until he was beaten to death by survivors.

Following the massacre, Jewish Israelis were barred from entering major Arab communities in Hebron. The Israeli government also took extreme measures against Palestinians following the deadly riots after the massacre, expelling them from certain streets near Jewish settlements in Hebron, such as Al-Shuhada Street, where many Palestinians had homes and businesses, and allowing access exclusively to Jewish Israelis and foreign tourists.

The Israeli government and the international community condemned the massacre. Israel arrested followers of Meir Kahane, criminalized the Kach movement and affiliated movements as terrorist, forbidding certain Israeli settlers to enter Palestinian towns, and demanding that those settlers turn in their army-issued rifles, although rejecting a Palestinian Liberation Organization demand that all settlers in the West Bank be disarmed and that an international force be created to protect Palestinians.

Goldstein's gravesite became a pilgrimage site for Jewish extremists. The following words are inscribed on the tomb: "He gave his life for the people of Israel, its Torah and land." In 1999, after the passing of Israeli legislation outlawing monuments to terrorists, the Israeli Army dismantled the shrine that had been built to Goldstein at the site of his interment. The tombstone and its epitaph, calling Goldstein a martyr with clean hands and a pure heart, was left untouched. After the flagstones around it were pried away under the eye of a military chaplain, the ground was covered with gravel.

Early life and education
Goldstein was born on December 9, 1956, as Benjamin Goldstein in Brooklyn, New York, to an Orthodox Jewish family. He attended the Yeshiva of Flatbush religious day school. He studied medicine at Yeshiva University, receiving a medical degree from the Albert Einstein College of Medicine. He belonged to the Jewish Defense League (JDL), a militant Jewish organization founded by his boyhood acquaintance Meir Kahane.

Immigration to Israel
Goldstein immigrated to Israel in 1983. He served as a physician in the Israel Defense Forces (IDF), first as a conscript, then in the reserve forces. Following the end of his active duty, Goldstein worked as a physician, and lived in the Israeli settlement of Kiryat Arba near Hebron, where he worked as an emergency doctor, and was involved in treating victims of Arab-Israeli violence. He changed his name from Benjamin to Baruch, married a Soviet immigrant named Miriam, and had four children. Israeli press reports claimed that Goldstein refused to treat Arabs, even Arab soldiers serving in the IDF, believing it was against Jewish laws to treat non-Jews even for payment. This was also reflected in comments by his acquaintances. Goldstein was active in Kahane's Kach party, and was third on the party list for the Knesset during the 1984 elections.
He compared Israel's democracy to the Nazi regime, and was in the habit of wearing a yellow star with the word JUDE on it.

Massacre

On February 25, 1994, that year's Purim day, Goldstein entered a room in the Cave of the Patriarchs that was serving as a mosque, wearing an Israeli army uniform "with the insignia of rank, creating the image of a reserve officer on active duty". He then opened fire, killing 29 worshippers and wounding more than 125. Mosque guard Mohammad Suleiman Abu Saleh said he thought that Goldstein was trying to kill as many people as possible, and described how there were "bodies and blood everywhere". Eventually, Goldstein was overcome and beaten to death by survivors of the massacre. According to Ian Lustick, "By mowing down Arabs he believed wanted to kill Jews, Goldstein was re-enacting part of the Purim story."

Palestinian protests and riots immediately followed the shooting; in the following week, twenty-five Palestinians were killed (by the Israel Defense Forces), as well as five Israelis. Following the riots, the Israeli government imposed a two-week curfew on the 120,000 Palestinian residents of Hebron. The 400 Jewish settlers of H2 were free to move around. Israeli Prime Minister Yitzhak Rabin telephoned Palestine Liberation Organization (PLO) leader Yasser Arafat, and described the attack as a "loathsome, criminal act of murder". In an address to the Knesset, Rabin, addressing not just Goldstein and his legacy but also other militant settlers, stated: You are not part of the community of Israel ... You are not part of the national democratic camp which we all belong to in this house, and many of the people despise you. You are not partners in the Zionist enterprise. You are a foreign implant. You are an errant weed. Sensible Judaism spits you out. You placed yourself outside the wall of Jewish law ... We say to this horrible man and those like him: you are a shame on Zionism and an embarrassment to Judaism." The Israeli government condemned the massacre, and responded by arresting followers of Meir Kahane, forbidding certain settlers from entering Arab towns, and demanding that those settlers turn in their army-issued rifles, though rejecting a PLO demand that settlers be disarmed and that an international force be created to protect Palestinians. Goldstein was immediately "denounced with shocked horror even by the mainstream Orthodox", and many in Israel classified Goldstein as insane.

Gravesite and shrine

Israeli military authorities refused to allow Goldstein to be buried in the Jewish cemetery in Hebron. He was buried opposite the Meir Kahane Memorial Park in Kiryat Arba, a Jewish settlement adjacent to Hebron. The park is named in memory of Rabbi Meir Kahane, founder of the Israeli far-right political party Kach, a group classified by the United States and Israeli governments as a terrorist group. Goldstein was a long-time devotee of Kahane.

The gravesite has become a pilgrimage site for Jewish extremists; a plaque near the grave reads, "To the holy Baruch Goldstein, who gave his life for the Jewish people, the Torah, and the nation of Israel". According to Baruch Marzel, about 10,000 people had visited the grave by the year 2000. In 1996, members of the Labor Party called for the shrine-like landscaped prayer area near the grave to be removed, and Israeli security officials expressed concern that the grave would encourage extremists. In 1999, following passage of a law designed to prohibit monuments to terrorists, and an associated Supreme Court ruling, the Israeli Army bulldozed the shrine and prayer area set up near Goldstein's grave. A new tomb has been built, and still receives visits from Jewish pilgrims.

Veneration by extremists

While mainstream Jewish religious leaders, including the chief rabbis of Israel, rejected the suggestion that killing Palestinians was authorized by the Torah, some extremist religious Jews have defended Goldstein's actions.

At Goldstein's funeral, Rabbi Yaacov Perrin claimed that even one million Arabs are "not worth a Jewish fingernail". Samuel Hacohen, a teacher at a Jerusalem college, declared Goldstein the "greatest Jew alive, not in one way, but in every way", and said that he was "the only one who could do it, the only one who was 100 percent perfect". Rabbi Dov Lior of Kiryat Arba declared that Goldstein was "holier than all the martyrs of the Holocaust".

In the weeks following the massacre, hundreds of Israelis traveled to Goldstein's grave to celebrate Goldstein's actions. Some Hasidim danced and sang around his grave. According to one visitor to the gravesite in the wake of the attacks, "If [Goldstein] stopped these so-called peace talks, then he is truly holy because this is not real peace." Some visitors declared Goldstein a "saint" and "hero of Israel".

The phenomenon of the veneration of Goldstein's tomb persisted for years. The grave's epitaph said that Goldstein "gave his life for the people of Israel, its Torah, and its land". In 1999, after the passing of Israeli legislation outlawing monuments to terrorists, the Israeli Army dismantled the shrine that had been built to Goldstein at the site of his interment. In the years after the dismantling of the shrine, radical Jewish settlers continued to celebrate the anniversary of the massacre in the West Bank, sometimes even dressing up themselves or their children to look like Goldstein.

In 2010, Jewish settlers sang songs in praise of Baruch Goldstein's massacre demonstratively in front of their Arab neighbours, during celebrations of Purim. A phrase from one song reads, "Dr. Goldstein, there is none other like you in the world. Dr. Goldstein, we all love you ... He aimed at terrorists' heads, squeezed the trigger hard, and shot bullets, and shot, and shot."

See also
Israeli–Palestinian conflict
Jewish fundamentalism
Kahanism
Terrorism in Israel
Zionist political violence
List of rampage killers (religious, political, or ethnic crimes)

References

External links
Israel Ministry of Foreign Affairs – Excerpts from the report of the Commission of Inquiry Into the Massacre at the Tomb of the Patriarchs in Hebron (aka the "Shamgar Report")
UN document containing extracts of the Israeli inquiry report

1956 births
1994 deaths
Albert Einstein College of Medicine alumni
American emigrants to Israel
American Kahanists
American anti-communists
American mass murderers
American murderers of children
American Orthodox Jews
Deaths by beating
Israeli Kahanists
Israeli mass murderers
Israeli murderers of children
Israeli military doctors
Israeli Orthodox Jews
Israeli settlers
Naturalized citizens of Israel
People from Brooklyn
Jewish military personnel
Jewish physicians
People from Kiryat Arba
Physicians from New York (state)
Jewish religious terrorism
 
20th-century Israeli physicians
Cave of the Patriarchs massacre